St Macartan's Cathedral is the cathedral church of the Roman Catholic Diocese of Clogher in Ireland. It is located in the townland of Latlurcan, Monaghan town in the ecclesiastical parish of Monaghan and Rackwallace. It was built between the years of 1861 and 1893 and is the only Catholic cathedral in the county.

History
The cathedra of the Bishop of Clogher was removed to Monaghan town in the mid-19th century. The plan for the cathedral was proposed in 1858 by Bishop Charles MacNally. The site was purchased in 1861. Architect James Joseph McCarthy (1817–1882) designed the cathedral in a 14th-century Gothic architectural style was begun in 1862. Most limestone was quarried locally. Architect William Hague Jr. (1840–1899) from Cavan oversaw the building of the spire after 1882, which stands 81 metres high, as well as the gate lodge. Bishop James Donnelly, bishop of Clogher from 1864 to 1893, oversaw most of the building and dedicated it on 21 August 1892 to the service of God and the patronage of Macartan, the diocese's patron saint.
The cathedral was renovated and the beautiful interior was simplified and left feeling bare. For those looking to pray to the Blessed Sacrament, the tabernacle can be found out of immediate eyesight on the right hand side of the sanctuary.

Burials
 Patrick Mulligan (1912–1990), Bishop of Clogher

See also
List of cathedrals in Ireland

References

External links
     
 Monaghan Guide: St. Macartan's Cathedral
 Archiseek: St. Macartan's Cathedral
 Cathedrals and Churches of Ireland: Monaghan

Buildings and structures in Monaghan (town)
Roman Catholic cathedrals in the Republic of Ireland
Roman Catholic Diocese of Clogher
Religious buildings and structures in County Monaghan
Roman Catholic churches completed in 1893
19th-century Roman Catholic church buildings in Ireland
1861 establishments in Ireland
19th-century churches in the Republic of Ireland